Sino Biopharmaceutical Limited (|Hang Seng Index component), shortly Sino Biopharm, is a civilian-run enterprise principally engaged in the medicine products business in Mainland China.

Being a member of Charoen Pokphand Group and headquartered in Hong Kong and Beijing, Sino Biopharm is engaged in researching, developing, producing, and selling biopharmaceutical products for the medical treatment of ophthalmia, as well as modernized Chinese medicine and chemical medicine for the treatment of hepatitis through its subsidiaries.

Sino Biopharm is also involved in other minor businesses through its subsidiaries, such as properties, health food, optical glass, optical and auditory products.

References

External links
 
Sino Biopharmaceutical Limited

Pharmaceutical companies of Hong Kong
Civilian-run enterprises of China
Manufacturing companies of Hong Kong
Pharmaceutical companies established in 2000
Charoen Pokphand